Grantville may refer to:

Places
Grantville, Victoria, Australia
Grantville, Nova Scotia, Canada
Grantville, Alberta, Canada
Grantville, San Diego, California, U.S.
Grantville station
Grantville, California, former name of Lower Lake, California, U.S.
Grantville, Georgia, U.S.
Grantville, Greene County, Georgia, U.S.
Grantville, Kansas, U.S.
Grantville, Pennsylvania, U.S.

Fictional entities
Grantville (1632 series), a fictional city in Eric Flint's 1632 series
Baron Grantville, a character in the Honorverse of David Weber

See also

Grantsville (disambiguation)
Granville (disambiguation)